Oxidus is a genus of flat-backed millipedes in the family Paradoxosomatidae. There are about nine described species in Oxidus.

Species
These nine species belong to the genus Oxidus:
 Oxidus avia (Verhoeff, 1937)
 Oxidus circofera Verhoeff, 1931
 Oxidus filarius Attems, 1932
 Oxidus gigas (Attems, 1953)
 Oxidus gracilis (Koch, 1847) (greenhouse millipede)
 Oxidus kosingai Wang, 1958
 Oxidus obtusus (Takakuwa, 1942)
 Oxidus riukiaria (Verhoeff, 1940)
 Oxidus sontus (Chamberlin, 1910)

References

Further reading

External links

 

Polydesmida
Millipedes of North America